Alès is a commune and subprefecture in the Gard department in the Occitania region in Southern France. Until 1926, it was officially known as Alais. In 2019, it had a population of 41,837.

Geography
It is located at the foot of the Cévennes, near the Cévennes National Park. Alès station has rail connections to Nîmes, Mende and Clermont-Ferrand.

History

Alès may be the modern successor of Arisitum, where, in about 570, Sigebert, King of Austrasia, created a bishopric. In his campaign against the Visigoths, the Merovingian king Theudebert I (533–548) conquered part of the territory of the Diocese of Nîmes. His later successor Sigebert set up the new diocese, comprising fifteen parishes in the area controlled by the Franks, which included a number of towns to the north of the Cevenne: Alès, Le Vigan, Arre, Arrigas, Meyrueis, Saint-Jean-du-Gard, Anduze, and Vissec. The diocese disappeared in the 8th century with the conquest of the whole of Septimania by the Franks. No longer a residential bishopric, Arisitum is today listed by the Catholic Church as a titular see.

After the Edict of Nantes, Alès was one of the places de sûreté given to the Huguenots. Louis XIII took back the town in 1629, and the Peace of Alès, signed on 29 June of that year, suppressed the political privileges of the Protestants, while continuing to guarantee toleration.

At the request of Louis XIV, a see was again created at Alais by Pope Innocent XII, in 1694. The future Cardinal de Bausset, Bossuet's biographer, was Bishop of Alais from 1784 to 1790.  It was suppressed after the French Revolution, and its territory was divided between the diocese of Avignon and the diocese of Mende.

Demographics

Economy
Alès is the centre of a mining district and hosts the École des Mines d'Alès.

Historically, according to the Encyclopædia Britannica Eleventh Edition (1911):
"The town is one of the most important markets for raw silk and cocoons in the south of France, and the Gardon supplies power to numerous silk-mills. It is also the centre of a mineral field, which yields large quantities of coal, iron, zinc and lead; its blast-furnaces, foundries, glass-works and engineering works afford employment to many workmen."

Sports
The town has one association football team called Olympique Alès who currently play in the Championnat National.

Sights
Historically, according to the Encyclopædia Britannica Eleventh Edition:
"The streets are wide and its promenades and fine plane-trees make the town attractive; but the public buildings, the chief of which are the Saint-Jean-Baptiste cathedral, a heavy building of the 18th century, and the citadel, which serves as barracks and prison, are of small interest."

 Parc botanique de la Tour Vieille

Notable people

Rigord, chronicler (probable birthplace)
Jean-Pierre des Ours de Mandajors (1679–1747), historian and playwright
Jean-Baptiste Dumas (1800–1884), chemist
Gabriel Montoya (1868–1914), Parisian chansonnier
Charles Dugas (1885–1957), archaeologist and hellenist
Edgard de Larminat (1895–1962), general
Louis Leprince-Ringuet (1901–2000), physicist
Lucile Randon (1904–2023), supercentenarian.
Maurice André (1933–2012), trumpeter
Catherine Daufès-Roux (born 1963), former Member of Parliament
Laurent Blanc (born 1965), footballer
Stéphane Sarrazin (born 1975), sportscar racing driver, rally driver
Romain Dumas (born 1977), sportscar racing driver
Nabil El Zhar (born 1986), footballer
Vincent Abril (born 1995), sportscar racing driver

Louis Pasteur did his research on the silkworm disease (pébrine and flacherie) at Alès, and the town dedicated a bust to his memory. There is also a statue of the chemist J.B. Dumas. Alphonse Daudet wrote his semi-autobiographical novel "Le Petit Chose" while teaching at the Collège of Alès.

Twin towns – sister cities

Alès is twinned with:
 Kilmarnock, Scotland, United Kingdom

See also
Communes of the Gard department

References

External links

Official website (in French)
The Regordane Way or St Gilles Trail which runs through Alès

Communes of Gard
Subprefectures in France
Mining communities in France
Languedoc